Forget and Forgive (French: L'énigme; UK: Left for Dead; France: Oublier et pardonner) is a 2014 Canadian suspense-thriller television film directed by Tristan Dubois and starring Elisabeth Röhm as a policewoman who, after a brutal interrogation, is left for dead, but survives with no memory of her life or her family. The film features an original score by James Gelfand and Louise Tremblay.

Plot
Left for dead after a brutal interrogation apparently gone wrong, vice detective Anna Walker (Elisabeth Röhm) awakes in the hospital with no memory of who she is. She recognizes no-one; not her husband Tate (Neil Napier), her daughter Emily (Vivien Endicott-Douglas), nor Derek (Tygh Runyan), her partner on the police force, who tells her most of the rest of the force is occupied with solving the recent murder of the mayor, her own assault being less of a priority. On her return home Anna discovers that hers is not a happy family: her relationship with Emily was extremely strained; Anna herself was on the verge of leaving Tate. She has other problems brewing: whoever assaulted her may want to finish the job, if her memory returns. A visit from Internal Affairs suggests some on the force may think she is faking her amnesia and has something to hide.

Not knowing whom to trust, she must find out who may still be pursuing her, before they eliminate her once and for all. Anna begins an investigation of her own immediate past and discovers she was callous and competitive enough to put her job above her family and was having an affair with Derek, who helps her with her investigation. The more she learns, the more she wants to put right whatever went wrong in her life. She and Derek were on the take. Her investigations lead to realize she had found a safe house for a witness to the mayor's murder, a young prostitute. Eventually, she works out that the only safe place for her was her father's house, and, going there, she unwittingly leads the killer's gang to the safe house, as Derek betrays her. She has no choice but to return with him and the young woman, as the gang leader has her husband and daughter hostage...

Cast

Production
Production studio Incendo has produced several female-led thriller films.
Forget and Forgive was produced with the participation of Bell Media. Principal photography began on 14 April 2014 in  Montréal.

James Gelfand co-scored the film with his wife, pianist Louise Tremblay, while also working on two other projects over a number of months: Christmas film Northpole and The Prodigal Son, a "biblical musical".

Release

Broadcasts
In Canada, Forget and Forgive aired for the first time on 28 December 2014, on CTV Television Network. In the United States, it aired on the Lifetime Movie Network on 29 and 30 May 2015. It remains in the regular rotation on Lifetime.

Home media and streaming
A DVD was released in 2015.
Forget and Forgive was available on Netflix until March 2018, and is available from myLifetime.com and Amazon Prime.

French version
The film is available dubbed in French, in an adaptation by Pascale Lortie and Michel Gatignol.

Reception

Critical response
Virginia DeBolt found the story interesting, but was put off by the "over-the-top handling of some of the emotional scenes". Jim McLennan finds Röhm "okay", and is impressed by the opening sequence which is "surprisingly brutal, given the medium and origins", but the script does not manage "to live up to the toughness with which it begins."In other hands, the general scenario might have made for an interesting study: how a sudden, externally triggered change in someone’s character affects them and those around them. However, the film instead chooses to wander off in a number of far less successful directions.

Andy Webb, who points out that Elisabeth Röhm previously played a woman with amnesia in the 2009 TV film Desperate Escape, finds the story is "never gripping enough" despite its "decent idea"; unfortunately, "the execution of it fails to do it justice" and "lengthy build up" feels "a bit drawn out." On a German TV film review site, Röhm is described as unenthusiastic in her role, which the site ascribes to a predictable script; as well, the direction and photography appear amateurish. The Radio Times assigned the film 2 out of 5 stars.

Nominations

References

External links
Official trailer on YouTube
Forget and Forgive on IMDb

2014 films
2014 thriller drama films
Canadian thriller drama films
English-language Canadian films
Films about amnesia
Canadian thriller television films
2014 drama films
2010s Canadian films